Following is a list of multimedia franchises originating in films, whether animated or live-action.

In the following tables, the initial media through which the franchise characters or settings became known is shown in boldface. Only works of fiction are only considered part of the series; a book or a documentary film about the franchise is not itself an installment in the franchise.

Franchises originating in animated films

Franchises originating in live-action films

See also
 List of fictional shared universes in film and television – many multimedia franchises are based in fictional universes
 List of public domain works with multimedia adaptations
 List of highest-grossing media franchises
 Media mix

References

Lists of multimedia franchises